Tindivanam division is a revenue division in the Viluppuram district of Tamil Nadu, India.

References 
 

Viluppuram district